Samuel Bernard, also known as Jacques-Samuel Bernard  was a French miniature painter and engraver.

Life
Born to a Protestant family in Paris in 1615,  he was the son of Noel Bernard, a painter. He was a pupil of both Simon Vouet and of Louis du Guernier, and made some attempts at fresco painting, but not succeeding to his expectation, he painted miniatures for a while, before finally devoting himself entirely to engraving. Some still lifes, painted in the early 1660s are also known.

He joined the Académie Royale de Peinture et de Sculpture on its foundation in 1648 and became professor there in 1655. He was expelled on religious grounds in 1681, but restored to his post following his recantation of Protestantism four years later.

He died in Paris in 1687. The financier Samuel Bernard was his son.

Works
He engraved  plates, both in line and in mezzotint. They include:

Line engravings
Charles Louis, Duke of Bavaria; after van Dyck.
Louis du Guernier, miniature painter.
Philip, Count of Bethune.
Anne Tristan de la Beaume de Luze, Archbishop of Paris; after De Troy.
The Apparition of St. Peter and St. Paul to Attila; after Raphael. His best work.
The Young Astyanax discovered by Ulysses in the Tomb of Hector; after Bourdon.
The Crucifixion; after Ph. de Champagne.
The Virgin Mary, with the dead Christ; after the same.
The Ascension; after the same.
An allegorical subject of Concord.
The Flight into Egypt; after Guido.

Mezzotints
The Portrait of Louis XIV; oval.
Sebastian, le Prestre de Vauban; after F. de Troy.
The Nativity; after Rembrandt.
A Herdsman driving Cattle.
An Ox Market; after B. Castiglione.
The Kepose; called La Zingara; after Correggio.

References

Attribution:
 

1615 births
1687 deaths
Painters from Paris
17th-century French engravers
17th-century French painters
French male painters
Calvinist and Reformed artists